Alpha-1,6-mannosylglycoprotein 6-beta-N-acetylglucosaminyltransferase B is an enzyme that in humans is encoded by the MGAT5B gene.

References

Further reading